"Fly Again" was American dance-pop singer Kristine W's seventh single release and seventh consecutive number-one Billboard Hot Dance Club Play hit.  This song served as the first single from her third official album, Fly Again.

Music video
The music video "Fly Again" was directed by Mike Ruiz and produced by Jeff Beasley.

See also
List of number-one dance hits (United States)

References

Kristine W songs
2003 singles
2003 songs
Songs written by Kristine W